Alianza was an Argentine hard rock band, with former members of Rata Blanca.

History
Alianza was created by the singer Adrián Barilari and the keyboard player Hugo Bistolfi, along with session musicians. Barilari and Bistolfi left Rata Blanca, rejecting the style shift initiated in El Libro Oculto, with more aggressive heavy metal. Alianza was focused instead in ballads and hard rock.

Rata Blanca lost popularity without Barilari, and broke up. Barilari and Bistolfi were invited to a concert of Walter Giardino Temple, the new band of Rata Blanca's leader Walter Giardino. This concert led to a reunion of Rata Blanca, with Barilari and Bistolfi, and the subsequent breakup of Alianza.

Members

Regular members
 Adrián Barilari - Singer
 Hugo Bistolfi - Keyboards, chorus

Session musicians
 Gonzalo Ledesma - Guitars
 Daniel Telis - Guitars
 Marcelo Pérez Schneider - Bass
 Guillermo Vadalá - Bass
 Javier Barilari - Chorus
 Fabián Bruno - Drums
 Jota Morelli - Drums

Discography
 Sueños del Mundo (1994)
 Alianza (1997)
 Huellas (1999)

References

Argentine heavy metal musical groups
Musical groups established in 1994
Musical groups disestablished in 2000
1994 establishments in Argentina